Karl Albert Kurt von Fritz (25 August 1900 in Metz – 16 July 1985 in Feldafing) was a German classical philologist.

Appointed to an extraordinary professorship for Greek at the University of Rostock in 1933, he was one of the two German professors (the other one being Karl Barth) to refuse to swear the Hitler Oath in 1934, and was dismissed. He then held posts at Corpus Christi College, Oxford, Reed College, and Columbia University.

In 1954 von Fritz returned to Germany, initially to the Free University of Berlin. From 1958 until his retirement in 1968 he taught at the University of Munich.

Kurt von Fritz was a member of the Bavarian Academy of Sciences from 1959, a corresponding member of the Austrian Academy of Sciences from 1962 and a corresponding fellow of the British Academy from 1973.

Von Fritz gave the Howison Lectures in Philosophy in 1957. In 1981 he received the Sigmund Freud Prize for Academic Prose from the German Academy for Language and Literature.

References 

Corresponding Fellows of the British Academy
1900 births
1985 deaths
Writers from Metz
German classical philologists
Members of the Bavarian Academy of Sciences
Members of the Austrian Academy of Sciences
Academic staff of the University of Rostock
Academic staff of the Free University of Berlin
Academic staff of the Ludwig Maximilian University of Munich
Emigrants from Nazi Germany to the United States